Tvishi may refer to:

 Tvishi, Tsageri, a village in Tsageri municipality, Georgia
 Tvishi (wine), a Georgian wine